In biological classification, Neomorphidae is a proposed family of birds, separating the ground cuckoos (including roadrunners) from the rest of the cuckoo family.  It is traditionally nested within the family Cuculidae as the subfamily Neomorphinae.

Roadrunners 
1321 Tapera naevia striped cuckoo
1322 Morococcyx erythropygus lesser ground-cuckoo
1323 Dromococcyx phasianellus pheasant cuckoo
1324 Dromococcyx pavoninus pavonine cuckoo
1325 Geococcyx californianus greater roadrunner
1326 Geococcyx velox lesser roadrunner
1327 Neomorphus geoffroyi rufous-vented ground-cuckoo
1328 Neomorphus squamiger scaled ground-cuckoo
1329 Neomorphus radiolosus banded ground-cuckoo
1330 Neomorphus rufipennis rufous-winged ground-cuckoo
1331 Neomorphus pucheranii red-billed ground-cuckoo

References 

Bird families